Ahmed Abdelhak (born 14 February 1988) is a Qatari handball player for Al-Gharafa and the Qatari national team.

He participated at the 2017 World Men's Handball Championship.

References

1988 births
Living people
Qatari male handball players